Favartia coltrorum is a species of sea snail, a marine gastropod mollusk in the family Muricidae, the murex snails or rock snails.

Description

Distribution
This marine species occurs off Bahia, Brazil.

References

 Houart, R., 2005. Description of a new species of Favartia (Gastropoda: Muricidae: Muricopsinae) from Brazil. Novapex 6(1-2): 41-44

Muricidae
Gastropods described in 2005